Liu Changcheng (born 3 May 1964) is a former Chinese volleyball player. He participated in the 1984 Summer Olympics. He later immigrated to Germany, and played for the German clubs Moerser SC (1989–1993) and Post Telekom Berlin (1993–1995). He is currently a coach in Germany.

References

Chinese men's volleyball players
1964 births
Living people
Olympic volleyball players of China
Volleyball players from Beijing
Volleyball players at the 1984 Summer Olympics
Asian Games medalists in volleyball
Asian Games gold medalists for China
Volleyball players at the 1986 Asian Games
Medalists at the 1986 Asian Games
20th-century Chinese people